This is a list of rural localities in Kalmykia. The Republic of Kalmykia (Haľmg Tañğç ) is a federal subject of Russia (a republic). As of the 2010 Census, its population was 289,481.

Locations 
 Iki-Burul
 Malye Derbety
 Priyutnoye
 Utta
 Zaagin Sala

See also 
 
 Lists of rural localities in Russia

References 

Kalmykia